Mata Hari is a 2017 Russian-Portuguese television series, produced by International production company Star Media in association with Channel One (Russia) and Inter (Ukraine).

The series is dedicated to the story of the legendary spy, fatal temptress and passionate dancer Margareta Zelle, better known under the pseudonym Mata Hari, who was engaged in espionage activities in favor of Germany during the First World War.

Plot
Margaret MacLeod, persecuted by her ex-husband, is deprived of custody of her daughter and abandoned to the mercy of fate with no means of subsistence. She becomes a dancer and is desperate to find any other earnings.

Under the pseudonym Mata Hari, Margaret becomes the favorite of the European elite. For her the doors of luxurious mansions and villas open, each performance produces an incredible furore. But the First World War is coming, which will forever change the course of history.

And Mata Hari can barely foresee what role she is destined to play in the upcoming events.

Cast
in the order of appearance: 
 Vahina Giocante as Mata Hari
 John Corbett as Rudolph MacLeod
 Gérard Depardieu as Father Bernard
 Oisín Stack as Gabriel Astruc
 Alcides Estrella as Cyrus
 Anatoly Lobotsky as Monsieur Malle
 Viktoriya Isakova as Countess Lydia Kireevskaya
 Nuno Lopes as Baron Maximilian the Ride
 Chris Murphy as Hubert Surdier, chauffeur of Kireevskaya
 Rade Šerbedžija as industrialist Émile Étienne Guimet 
 Alexander Petrov as Mathieu Niwa, nicknamed "Knife", a thief and a murderer
 Rutger Hauer as Stolbakken, Judge
 Yehezkel Lazarov as Don Jesús Costello, Spanish Count
 Christopher Lambert as Gustav Kramer
 Kseniya Rappoport as Elizabeth Shragmuller
 Carlotto Cotta as Theophile Rastignac
 Maksim Matveyev as Vladimir Maslov, the captain
 Mariya Fomina as Vera Semihina
 Aleksei Guskov as Georges Ladoux, the head of the Deuxième Bureau
 Svetlana Khodchenkova as Zlatka Dzhenich
 Alexander Mikhaylov as Pyotr Semikhin
 Makar Zaporizhzhya as ensign Ryabov
 Dmitry Maltsev as Hervé Matin
 Peter Nesterov as Lieutenant Sakhnevich
 Alexander Khoshabaev as Mr Melo
 Ilya Slanevsky as German officer
 Nail Abdrakhmanov as David
 Artem Tsypin as Salinas
 Andrei Tartakov as Sergey Diaghilev
 Danila Dunaev as Pierre Lenoir
 Ruslan Dzhaybekov as André Citroën
 Alexander Ryazantsev as Nikolai Alexandrovich Lokhvitsky, Major-General of the Russian Expeditionary Force
 Natalia Gudkova as Michelle Riva
 Mikhail Dorozhkin as Salbarbe
 Igor Ivanov as Maître Clunet, lawyer

References

External links
 

Russian drama television series
Russian biographical films
2017 Russian television series debuts
2017 Russian television series endings
2017 Portuguese television series debuts
2010s Portuguese television series
Sociedade Independente de Comunicação original programming
Channel One Russia original programming
Russian biographical television series